Crownpoint High School is a public high school in Crownpoint, New Mexico. It is a part of the Gallup McKinley County Schools district.

Its attendance boundary includes Crownpoint and Borrego Pass.

History

By 1970 J. V. Walker and Associates conducted a review of school practices. An ad hoc committee was formed with six members to review the school's practices. It found no intentional misconduct.

On May 7, 1974 the district rehired Zane Smith as the principal, and it also rehired the assistant principal, after some community individuals asked them to do so, despite the school board initially leaning towards not retaining them. Despite twenty residents, including some students and parents, asking the school board to reconsider, the school board did not reverse its decision as not enough board members were present to form a quorum.

Curriculum
In 1973 the school began teaching horticulture.

References

External links
 Crownpoint High School

Public high schools in New Mexico
Schools in McKinley County, New Mexico